The following is a list of the MuchMusic Video Awards winners for the "VideoFACT Award", also called the "VideoFACT Best Independent Video Award"  in 2008 and "VideoFACT Indie Video of the Year" in 2009 after merging the "Best Independent Video Award" with the "VideoFACT Award".

MuchMusic Video Awards